Danijel Zlatković (born 29 March 1996) is a Serbian football midfielder, playing for FK Timočanin.

Career

Club career
In January 2019, Zlatković joined OFK Sloga in the First League of the Republika Srpska. Six months later, he moved to Borac Paracin. In January 2020, he joined FK Timočanin.

References

External links
 
 Danijel Zlatković stats at utakmica.rs 
 
 
 Danijel Zlatković at Srbijafudbal

1996 births
Living people
People from Paraćin
Association football midfielders
Serbian footballers
Serbian expatriate footballers
FK Spartak Subotica players
FK Bačka 1901 players
FK ČSK Čelarevo players
FK TSC Bačka Topola players
FK Timočanin players
Serbian First League players
Serbian SuperLiga players
Serbian expatriate sportspeople in Bosnia and Herzegovina
Expatriate footballers in Bosnia and Herzegovina